YRF Distribution is the domestic distribution arm of Yash Raj Films which handles the theatrical distribution business of YRF, throughout the territories of India, Nepal, and Bhutan.

Rohan Malhotra, born in Mumbai on 1 September 1986, is a well-respected entertainment professional in the Indian movie industry. He is one of the foremost thinkers in the field of movie distribution, and he has won multiple awards for executing product specific distribution strategies in the Indian market. He serves as Vice President—Distribution—Yash Raj Films and he is in charge of running YRF Distribution, the theatrical distribution business of Yash Raj Films, throughout the territories of India, Nepal and Burma.

Apart from its home productions, YRF Distribution has successfully released some of India's biggest & most loved films like Thugs Of Hindostan, Sui Dhaaga, Hichki, Tiger Zinda Hai, Qaidi Band, Meri Pyaari Bindu, Befikre, Sultan, Fan, Titli, Detective Byomkesh Bakshy!, Dum Laga Ke Haisha, Kill Dil, Daawat-e-Ishq, Mardaani, Bewakoofiyaan, Aaha Kalyanam, Gunday, Dhoom 3, Shuddh Desi Romance, Aurangzeb, Jab Tak Hai Jaan, Ek Tha Tiger, Ishaqzaade, Ladies vs Ricky Bahl, Mere Brother Ki Dulhan, Band Baaja Baaraat, Lafangey Parindey, Badmaash Company, Pyaar Impossible, Rocket Singh: Salesman of the Year, Dil Bole Hadippa!, New York (film), Rab Ne Bana Di Jodi, Roadside Romeo, Bachna Ae Haseeno, Thoda Pyaar Thoda Magic, Tashan, Aaja Nachle, Laaga Chunari Mein Daag, Chak De! India, Jhoom Barabar Jhoom, Tara Rum Pum, Kabul Express, Dhoom 2, Fanaa, Neal 'n' Nikki, Salaam Namaste, Bunty Aur Babli, Veer Zaara, Dhoom, Hum Tum, Saathiya, Mujhse Dosti Karoge, Mere Yaar Ki Shaadi Hai, Mohabbatein, Dil Toh Pagal Hai, Dilwale Dulhania Le Jayenge

YRF Distribution has successfully released films by other producers like De De Pyaar De, Chhota Bheem Kung Fu Dhamaka, Notebook, Zero, Loveyatri, Hanuman vs Mahiravana, Teefa in Trouble, Race 3, Ittefaq, Jab Harry Met Sejal, Tubelight, Piku, Happy New Year, Chhota Bheem and the Throne of Bali, D-Day, All the Best: Fun Begins, Dostana, Krazzy 4, Kabhi Alvida Na Kehna, Krrish, Mangal Pandey: The Rising, Kaal, Black, Gayab, Charas: A Joint Operation, Supari, Main Prem Ki Diwani Hoon, Kal Ho Na Ho, Koi Mil Gaya, Aashiq, Kabhi Khushi Kabhi Gham, Kaho Naa Pyaar Hai, Dulhan Hum Le Jayenge, Deewane, Refugee, Jaanwar, Biwi No.1, Mann, Kuch Kuch Hota Hai and have also handled off-beat films like Maine Gandhi Ko Nahin Mara, My Brother...Nikhil, Maqbool, Meenaxi: A Tale of Three Cities, Gaja Gamini, Godmother and Zubeidaa.

YRF Distribution has successfully released films in various languages like Grace of Monaco (film) (English), Happy New Year (Tamil & Telugu), Dhoom 3 (Tamil & Telugu), Aaha Kalyanam (Tamil & Telugu), Aa Gaye Munde U.K. De (Punjabi), Dhoom 2 (Tamil & Telugu), Yaaran Naal Baharan (Punjabi) & Sins (film) (English) across India.

YRF Distribution Offices

YRF Distribution has eleven offices across India in:-

1. Mumbai - Yash Raj Films Distributors Private Limited
(Mumbai Circuit – comprising parts of Maharashtra, Gujarat, Goa & North Karnataka)
Head: Mr. Rajesh Malhotra & Mr. Rohan Malhotra

2. Delhi - Yash Raj P. P. Associates Private Limited (Delhi - Uttar Pradesh Circuit - comprising Delhi, Uttar Pradesh & Uttaranchal)
Head: Mr. Rakesh Paul

3. Jalandhar- Yash Raj & Puri Company Private Limited
(East Punjab Circuit)
Head: Mr. Anil Puri

4. Jaipur - Yash Raj Jai Pictures Private Limited
(Rajasthan Circuit)
Head: Mr. Raj Bansal & Mr. Sunil Bansal

5. Amravati - Yash Raj Films Private Limited through Khajanchi Film Exchange
(Central Province Circuit)
Head: Mr. Bharat Khajanchi

6. Indore - Yash Raj Films Private Limited through Khajanchi Film Exchange
(Central India Circuit)
Head: Mr. Vijay Khajanchi

7. Bengaluru - Yash Raj Pal Films Distributors (Bangalore) Private Limited
(Mysore Circuit)
Head: Mr. Pal Chandani & Mr. Ajay Chandani

8. Hyderabad - Yash Raj Vandana Films Distributors Private Limited
(Nizam - Andhra Circuit)
Head: Mr. Sahdev Ghei & Mr. Kishanchand Jethani.

9. Kolkata - Yash Raj Jalan Distributors LLP (West Bengal, Bihar, Assam & Orissa Circuit)
Head: Mr. Pritam Jalan & Mr. Kushagra Jalan

10. Chennai - Yash Raj Films Private Limited through SPI Cinemas Private Limited
(Tamil Nadu Circuit)
Head: Mr. Swaroop Reddy

11. Kochi  - Yash Raj Films Private Limited through Jawahar Films Private Limited, 
(Kerala Circuit)
Head: Mr. Himmat Singh Ved

The offices are used to monetise the studio's slate of movies theatrically across India, Nepal and Burma so every movie can reach its widest possible audience in the most cost-effective manner.

References

Indian film studios